Benjamin is a donkey in George Orwell's 1945 novel Animal Farm. He is also the oldest of all the animals (he is alive in the last scene of the novel). He is less straightforward than most characters in the novel, and a number of interpretations have been put forward to which social class he represents as regards to the Russian Revolution and the Soviet Union. (Animal Farm is an allegory for the evolution of Communism in Russia, with each animal representing a different social class, e.g. Boxer represents the working class.) Benjamin also represents the old people of Russia because he remembers the old laws that have been changed.

Interpretations 

Some interpret Benjamin as representing the elderly populous of Russia, because he is old and cynical. Others feel that he represents the Menshevik intelligentsia as he is just as intelligent, if not more so than the novel's pigs, yet he is marginalised. He is very cynical about the Revolution and life in general. It has also been argued that he represents the skeptical people who believed that Communism  would not help the people of Russia, but who did not criticise it fervently enough to lose their lives. His Biblical name could also imply that he represents the Jewish populace of Russia whose lives were not remotely improved under Joseph Stalin's leadership.

He is one of the wisest animals on the farm and is able to "read as well as any pig". However, he rarely uses his ability, because he feels there is nothing worth reading. He does not use his ability for the benefit of others until the end of the book when Boxer is sent off to the slaughterhouse, and when Clover asks him to read the public display of the Seven Commandments, as they, for the last time in the book, changed; Benjamin reveals that the Commandments now consist entirely of the message "All animals are equal, but some animals are more equal than others". Despite his age, he is never given the option of retirement (none of the animals are). Only the pigs' betrayal of his best friend, Boxer, spurs him into (failed) action, after which Benjamin becomes even more cynical than ever.

He is also quite significant in that he is not quite a horse (the working class) and yet definitely not a leader like the pigs, although his intellect is at least equal to theirs, this implies that Benjamin is a symbol of the intelligentsia who during the revolution and its aftermath are very much aware of what is going on, but do nothing about it. Although he is aware of their mistreatment (especially that of Boxer) and can see how the basic rules of their society are changing, he is unwilling to act on it in any way that would threaten his security.

Orwell became known as "Donkey George" to his friends – a reference to both his gloomy disposition and the character of Benjamin.

Film 
In the 1954 film, Benjamin is voiced by Maurice Denham and is the main protagonist. In the film, it is Benjamin who leads the other animals in a counter-revolution against Napoleon when his abuses finally go too far.

In the 1999 film, he is voiced by Pete Postlethwaite (who also played Farmer Jones in the film). In the film, Benjamin simply flees Napoleon's unendurable regime with some of the other animals and returns after the regime had collapsed (neither event occurs in the book).

References

Animal Farm characters
Fictional donkeys
Literary characters introduced in 1945
Fictional revolutionaries
Male characters in literature